is a Japanese entertainment news website that debuted on February 1, 2007. It is operated by Natasha, Inc. The website is named after the song of the same name by Julio Iglesias. Natalie has been providing news for such leading Japanese portals and social networks as Mobage Town, GREE, Livedoor, Excite, Mixi, and Yahoo! Japan. It has also been successful on Twitter, with 1,510,000 followers as of February 2017, being the third-most-followed Japanese media company, after The Mainichi Shimbun and The Asahi Shimbun.

History 
Natasha, Inc., a content provider, was founded in December 2005, becoming a limited company in February 2006 and being demutualized in January 2007.

On February 1, 2007, Natasha, Inc. opened its own news website Natalie, named after the song "Nathalie" by Julio Iglesias. It was dedicated exclusively to music news and created with the idea of updating on a daily basis, something that newspapers could not do. The website also offered optional registration, that would allow commenting on news articles and creating a list of up to 30 artists to receive updates about.

Natalie grew fast, opening a manga news sub-site, on December 25, 2008, and a comedian news sub-site, on August 5, 2009.

It opened a cultural goods shop, on August 1, 2012, a movie news sub-site, on March 23, 2015, and a theater news sub-site, on February 2, 2016. They also opened a snack news sub-site, on May 18, 2011, but it proved to be short-lived and closed on August 31 of the same year.

Management 

The founder and representative director of Natasha, Inc. is Takuya Ōyama. He is also the editor-in-chief of the music news website. As of 2008, the board director and editor-in-chief of Comic Natalie was Gen Karaki, also a bass player for such artists as Speed, Ram Rider, Haruko Momoi, and Nana Katase.

Since 2014, Natasha is a subsidiary of KDDI.

Critical response 
According to the news media outlet IT Media News, while the Natalie music website has much information for hardcore fans, the material is overly detailed and readers only glimpse at its content.

References

External links 
 Natalie (main website)
 Ongaku Natalie (music news)
 Comic Natalie (manga news)
 Owarai Natalie (news about comedians)
 Eiga Natalie (movie news)
 Stage Natalie (theater news)
 Natalie Store

2007 establishments in Japan
Anime and manga websites
Internet properties established in 2007
Japanese comedy websites
Japanese music websites
Japanese news websites
Japanese-language websites
KDDI